Rajecká Lesná (formerly ; , until 1906 ) is a village and municipality in Žilina District in the Žilina Region of northern Slovakia.

History
In historical records, the village was first mentioned in 1474.
Rajecka Lesna has been a place of pilgrimage since the 15th century. The largest pilgrimage takes place on 8 September, the feast of Virgin Mary's Nativity.

Geography
The municipality lies at an altitude of 513 metres and covers an area of 39.264 km². It has a population of about 1300 people.

External links

 http://www.statistics.sk/mosmis/eng/run.html
 Slovak Betlehem - Official pages
 Official pages of local RCC

Villages and municipalities in Žilina District